Andrea Nicolas Salvisberg (born 1 February 1989 in Rüegsauschachen, Rüegsau) is a professional Swiss triathlete and a member of the National Team (Team Olympic Distance).
Salvisberg is the Swiss Junior Champion of the years 2007 and 2008, and the Swiss U23 Champion of 2010.

In Switzerland, Andrea Nicolas Salvisberg, like two of his three brothers (Florin and Lukas Salvisberg), is a member of ewz power team.

Andrea Salvisberg lives in Hasle-Rüegsau.

ITU Competitions 
The following list is based upon the official ITU rankings and the ITU Athletes's Profile Page.
Unless indicated otherwise, the following events are triathlons (Olympic Distance) and refer to the Elite category.

References

External links 
 Website Salvisberg Brothers
 Salvisberg's Triathlon Club (ewz power team)

Swiss male triathletes
1989 births
Living people
People from Emmental District
Triathletes at the 2015 European Games
European Games competitors for Switzerland
Triathletes at the 2016 Summer Olympics
Olympic triathletes of Switzerland
Triathletes at the 2020 Summer Olympics
Sportspeople from the canton of Bern
20th-century Swiss people
21st-century Swiss people